Joseph Anthony Adams (born 13 February 2001) is a Welsh professional footballer who plays as a midfielder for  club Southport.

A graduate of the Bury academy, Adams made sporadic appearances during 18 months as a professional at the club and transferred to Brentford in 2019. After  years of exclusively B team football, he transferred to Dundalk in 2022. Following the 2022 season, Adams transferred to Southport. He is a former Wales youth international.

Club career

Bury 
A midfielder, Adams joined Bury at the age of seven. Having graduated through the club's academy, he made his first team debut as a substitute for Adam Thompson after 72 minutes of a 3–2 League One defeat to Northampton Town on 14 April 2018. After making four further senior appearances, Adams signed a -year professional contract in December 2018. His progression was such that later that month, he was recognised by League Football Education for his football and academic progress. After remaining with the U18 team and making only one further senior appearance during the 2018–19 season, Adams elected to depart Gigg Lane in July 2019. He was voted the club's 2018–19 Young Player of the Year.

Brentford 
On 19 July 2019, Adams transferred to the B team at Championship club Brentford and signed a three-year contract for an undisclosed fee. He scored 18 goals in 65 B team appearances during  years with the club and gained experience as a right wing back. Despite receiving a first team squad number during the 2019–20 season, Adams failed to win a call into a matchday squad. On 1 February 2021, Adams joined League Two club Grimsby Town on loan until the end of the 2020–21 season. On his second appearance, in a league match versus Crawley Town on 25 February, Adams assisted Filipe Morais for the Mariners' opening goal and scored what proved to be the winner in a 2–1 victory. After four further appearances, the loan was terminated early on 9 April. Adams departed Brentford in January 2022.

Dundalk 
In January 2022, Adams signed a one-year contract with League of Ireland Premier Division club Dundalk for an undisclosed fee. He made 34 appearances and scored one goal during the 2022 season, his only campaign with the club.

Southport 
On 14 March 2023, Adams signed an undisclosed-length contract with National League North club Southport.

International career
Adams won 26 caps and scored seven goals for Wales at U17, U19, U20 and U21 levels.

Career statistics

Honours 

 Bury Young Player of the Year: 2018–19

References

External links 

Welsh footballers
English Football League players
2001 births
Living people
Bury F.C. players
Association football midfielders
Wales youth international footballers
Brentford F.C. players
Wales under-21 international footballers
Grimsby Town F.C. players
Footballers from Bolton
Dundalk F.C. players
League of Ireland players
Southport F.C. players
National League (English football) players